The Dinosaur Discovery Museum in Kenosha, Wisconsin, United States, is dedicated to the exploration and explication of the relationship between modern birds and ancient carnivorous biped dinosaurs, the theropods, which include Carnotaurus, Tyrannosaurus rex, and Archaeopteryx. This link is especially well documented in the fossil record. The museum has the largest skeletal cast collection of theropods (meat-eating) dinosaurs in North America and is the only museum to focus a gallery specifically on the evolution of birds (avian dinosaurs) from non-avian dinosaurs, with a second smaller gallery focusing on "Little Clint", a three-year-old Tyrannosaurus uncovered by a dig conducted with the Carthage Institute of Paleontology.

The museum is located in the former post office (later the home of the Kenosha Public Museum building) and is a part of the Kenosha Public Museums system. The museum is unrelated to the Dinosaur Discovery Center in Maine.

Carthage Institute of Paleontology
The museum houses the Carthage Institute of Paleontology. The institute conducts field explorations with students from Carthage College and volunteers on Bureau of Land Management (BLM) land in the Late Cretaceous Hell Creek Formation.  Fossils collected are kept at the museum and cleaned in the prep lab, as it is a federal repository.  During the 2006 season, they discovered the remains of the youngest known Tyrannosaurus rex, nicknamed "Little Clint", with more bones of Little Clint found in 2007, along with hadrosaur and ceratopsian bones.

History
The museum opened in 2006. During the Kenosha unrest following the shooting of Jacob Blake, a Dilophosaurus statue outside the museum was toppled, and the museum was temporarily closed for repairs.

Gallery

See also
 Origin of birds

References

External links
 Official website

Buildings and structures in Kenosha, Wisconsin
Dinosaur museums in the United States
Museums in Kenosha County, Wisconsin
Natural history museums in Wisconsin
Paleontology in Wisconsin
2006 establishments in Wisconsin